The Vicar of Wakefield is a novel by Oliver Goldsmith.

It may also refer to several adaptations of the novel, including:
 The Vicar of Wakefield (1910 film), an American silent short drama 
 The Vicar of Wakefield (1913 film), a British silent historical drama film 
 The Vicar of Wakefield (1916 film), a British silent drama film
 The Vicar of Wakefield (1917 film), an American silent historical drama film
 The Vicar of Wakefield (TV series), a 1959 Italian television series